...Meanwhile is the tenth studio album by the British rock band 10cc, released in 1992. It was the band's first in nine years and marked the brief comeback of the original 10cc members Kevin Godley and Lol Creme.

Background to recording
The background to reuniting the original 10cc members was the success of the 1987 compilation album Changing Faces – The Very Best of 10cc and Godley & Creme: 

Initially, the project looked promising with Stewart and Gouldman entering the studio with a stockpile of 22 songs: 

At the request of the band's label, Polydor, 10cc became involved with the producer Gary Katz who was known for his strong association with Steely Dan, a band with which 10cc was often compared. Their relationship did not work out in terms of production and the use of session musicians for which both Gouldman and Stewart expressed their regrets:

 

The album also did not capture the actual reunion of 10cc: Godley performed lead vocals on "The Stars Didn't Show" and backing vocals on two songs, while Lol Creme supplied backing vocals on six songs. Neither contributed to the recording process of the album.

In a 2006 interview, Godley recalled the tension in the studio as he participated in the recording of the album:

Both Gouldman and Stewart point to the experience of making ...Meanwhile as the beginning of the end of their partnership and 10cc.

The album was recorded across five studios: Bearsville Studios in Woodstock, New York, The Hit Factory, New York, River Sound Studios, New York, Bill Schnee Studio, Los Angeles and Village Recorders, Los Angeles.

Apart from Godley's vocals on "The Stars Didn't Show" and a B-side "Don't" with Gouldman singing lead, all of the album's lead vocals were sung by Stewart. Session musicians Jeff Porcaro and Freddie Washington, who were hired by Katz, were on all tracks on drums and bass guitar respectively. Notable appearances on the album include Andrew Gold, who had collaborated with 10cc and Gouldman in the past, and the blues pianist Dr. John. The album's closing song, "Don't Break the Promises", was co-written by Stewart and Paul McCartney during the sessions for McCartney's sixth solo studio album Press to Play (1986) and was later finished by 10cc for the album.

The album's liner notes included the line: "In memory of Hyme "The Rhyme" Gouldman (1908–1991)". Gouldman, an amateur playwright, was the father of Graham Gouldman.

The cover art was designed by Laurence Dunmore with photography supplied by the Prefecture de Police, Paris.

Release and reception
By the time the album was completed and ready to release there had been changes at Polydor and the new regime did not believe it would be a hit, and spent very little to promote it. In a hospital radio interview in 1993, Gouldman said, "Polydor spent £750,000 to make it and £7,500 to promote it."

The album narrowly missed the Top 75 album chart in the UK (though it made No.66 in the Network chart – an alternative to the official chart). Two singles were released from the album. The first was "Woman in Love" backed with the non-album track "Man with a Mission". The single included the album version of the track rather than the single edit that was issued to radio. The second single, "Welcome to Paradise", a favourite of both Stewart and Gouldman, followed and included the album version of the title track, with two further non-album tracks, "Don't" and "Lost in Love". Both singles failed to chart.

Stewart and Gouldman said that there were additional songs planned as singles from ...Meanwhile. Gouldman was interviewed by Mark Wardle on Tarka Radio – a hospital radio station – in 1993 and said that "Don't Break the Promises" would have been the third single, and then "The Stars Didn't Show" and "Wonderland" as fourth and fifth possible singles. Due to the lack of success of the first two singles, these were cancelled. The album was not released in the US.

Later that year, Polydor, which the band had signed a five-album deal with, did not take up its option and dropped the band.

The album was reissued in 2008 with single edits and B-sides as bonus tracks.

Track listing

Bonus tracks on 2008 reissue

Bonus tracks on 2008 Japanese reissue

Personnel
10cc
 Eric Stewart – lead vocals (tracks 1-5, 7-10), slide guitar & strings (track 1), Fender Rhodes electric piano (tracks 1, 2, 5), grand piano
 Graham Gouldman – guitars (tracks 1-10), backing vocals (tracks 1-4, 6-9)
 Lol Creme – backing vocals (tracks 2, 4, 5, 6, 8, 9)
 Kevin Godley – lead vocals (track 6), backing vocals (tracks 5, 8)
Additional personnel
 Jeff Porcaro – drums, percussion 
 Freddie Washington – 5-string bass guitar 
 Michael Landau – lead guitar (tracks 2, 5, 6, 9, 10), rhythm guitar (track 7)
 David Paich – Hammond B3 organ (tracks 2, 6), melody synth (track 5), string synth (track 10)
 Bashiri Johnson – percussion (tracks 5, 6, 9), tambourine (track 7)
 Andrew Gold – 12 string guitar (track 8)
 Dr. John – grand piano (tracks 3, 4, 8)
 Paul Griffin – synthesizers (track 5)
 Jerry Hey – horn arrangement & trumpet (tracks 5, 7)
 Gary Grant – trumpet (tracks 5, 7)
 Dan Higgins – saxophone (tracks 5, 7)
 Frank Floyd, Fonzi Thornton, Curtis King, Tawatha Agee, Vaneese Thomas – backing vocals (track 5)
 Kim Hutchcroften – saxophone (track 7)
 Bill Reichenbach Jr. – trombone (track 7)
 Gordon Gaines – lead guitar (track 8)

References

10cc albums
1992 albums
Albums produced by Gary Katz
Polydor Records albums